The 2011-12 season was Sydney FC's seventh consecutive season in the Hyundai A-League since its foundation season in 2005–2006. The club will not compete in the 2012 AFC Champions League after failing to qualify during the previous season. The 2011–12 season also marks a new chapter in the history of the A-League, with new kit manufacturers for all teams. Reebok had held the rights to jersey manufacturing rights for the first six A-League seasons.  Sydney FC announced Adidas as their new kit maker.

2011–12 A-League squad
Players included in a Sydney FC squad in the 2010–11 season

Transfers

In

Out

Loan in

Loan out

Events

May
10th: Jamie Coyne signs for Sydney FC from Perth Glory on a 2-year deal.
20th: Former chairman of the National Rugby League club Canterbury Bulldogs, Dirk Melton, is announced as the new CEO of Sydney FC.

June

July
18th: Sydney FC announce that Adidas will be replacing Reebok as their kit supplier, signing a 4-year deal.

August
3rd: Sydney FC play their first pre-season friendly in preparation for the 2011–12 season, and tie 1–1 with NSW Super League club Macarthur Rams at Campbelltown Stadium.
8th: Sydney FC reveal their new kits, as well us unveiling their 2011–12 Membership drive at Martin Place, Sydney CBD.
9th: Former Socceroos goalkeeper Zeljko Kalac is announced as the new Goalkeeping Coach of Sydney FC, replacing John Filan.
10th: Sydney FC win their first pre-season game of the 2011–12 campaign, with a comprehensive 3–0 victory over former NSL club St. George Saints Football Club at Kogarah Oval.
17th: Sydney FC thump NSW Premier League team Parramatta Eagles 6–0 at Parramatta Stadium.
24th: Sydney FC continue their pre-season undefeated run with a 4–2 win over Bankstown City Lions at Jensen Oval. Nick Carle scores a brace, giving him 5 goals in 2 games.
25th: Sydney FC announced Socceroo Brett Emerton as their second Marquee player. The announcement comes days after rival club Melbourne Victory announced they had signed Harry Kewell, whom it was believed Sydney FC was also chasing.
30th: New marquee signing Brett Emerton is unveiled, and presented with the #7 jersey.
30th: Sydney FC are humbled 3–0 by Sutherland Sharks at Seymour Shaw Park, Miranda making it the first loss of the pre-season for Sydney FC.

September
1st: Club stalwart and long time serviceman from season one Terry McFlynn is announced he will retain the captaincy for the upcoming season.
10th: Sydney FC go down to NSW Premier League club Sydney Olympic 1–0.
17th: Sydney FC lose their first pre-season game against A-League opposition going down to Newcastle Jets 1–0 in Cessnock.

October
 8th: ROUND 1 v Melbourne Victory at Docklands Stadium finishes in a 0–0 draw. Striker Mark Bridge is sent off in the second half, following an incident with Rodrigo Vargas.
 15th: ROUND 2 v Brisbane Roar at the Sydney Football Stadium, results in Sydney FC's first loss of the season, going down 2–0 to defending Premiers & Champions Brisbane. Goals from Besart Berisha and Thomas Broich either side of half time allowed the Roar to win their 30th consecutive game without defeat.
 22nd: ROUND 3 v Adelaide United at Hindmarsh Stadium results in Sydney breaking their goal drought, and winning their first game of the season, with a come from behind 2–1 victory. Dario Vidosic put the Reds ahead after a mistake by defender Michael Beauchamp, however second half goals by Jamie Coyne, and Nick Carle allowed Sydney to post their first 3 points of the season.
 29th: ROUND 4 v Melbourne Heart at AAMI Park sees Sydney FC salvage a 1–1 draw in the dying seconds of injury time. A scrappy affair played in torrential rain, both sides failed to take their chances. Heart opening the scoring with 5 minutes to play through Brazilian striker Maycon. However Sydney replied through Nick Carle who scored his second goal of the season, right at the death.

November
 6th: ROUND 5 v Gold Coast United at the Sydney Football Stadium ends up with Sydney FC taking all 3 points in a miraculous second half comeback. Down 1–0 at half time, which was doubled to 2–0 seconds into the second half, 2 goals in as many minutes saw Bruno Cazarine and Nick Carle claw Sydney back to 2–2, before a penalty kick was awarded to Sydney FC deep into stoppage time. Karol Kisel converted, to give Sydney a 3–2 win. Gold Coast coach Miron Bleiberg accuses referee Peter Green of match fixing for "the sake of the game".
 12th: ROUND 6 v Perth Glory at NIB Stadium sees Sydney win their second game on the trot, with a 1–0 win. Striker Mark Bridge giving the visitors all 3 points after converting a low cross from Nick Carle. The win moves Sydney FC into 2nd position on the ladder, at the time only 2 points behind reigning Premiers & Champions, and currently undefeated in 2011–12 team Brisbane.
 19th: ROUND 7 v Central Coast Mariners at the Sydney Football Stadium results in a 3–2 loss to the Sky Blues, ending their 4-game unbeaten streak. The Mariners opened the scoring with a bullet free kick via Dutch import Patrick Zwaanswijk before extending the lead mid way into the 2nd half through New Zealand international Michael McGlinchey. Nick Carle however pulled one back, effectively scoring his 4th goal of the season, and for a short time it looked like a repeat of the 3–2 heroics against the Gold Coast a fortnight earlier, but those hopes were quashed when the Mariners striker Troy Hearfield put a third past Liam Reddy. In the dying minutes, Brett Emerton was fouled near the box, and he skillfully put the free kick up, and around the wall, scoring his first competitive goal in a Sydney FC shirt.
 27th: ROUND 8 v Wellington Phoenix at Westpac Stadium, Wellington, New Zealand results in the second consecutive loss for the Sky Blues, going down 2–1 this time to New Zealand club Wellington Phoenix. Wellington were up 2–0 with goals through Paul Ifill and Tim Brown, before Sydney's Bruno Cazarine picked up his 2nd goal of the season with a consolation goal in the 70th minute. The loss means Sydney drop a further place down in the ladder to fourth, allowing rivals Central Coast Mariners and Melbourne Victory to move into 2nd and 3rd respectively after they won their games.

December
4th: ROUND 9 v Brisbane Roar at Jubilee Oval, Carlton in Sydney's South-East ends with Sydney FC defeating Brisbane 2–0, ending the current defending Premiers & Champions 36-game winning streak, which is a record in Australian sport. An early goal, after just 36 seconds from young striker Dimitri Petratos got Sydney underway. Marquee man Brett Emerton got a flukey second goal from a corner kick midway through the first half, which the wind took and blew into the Brisbane goal, despite the best efforts from Goalkeeper Michael Theoklitos and former Sydney FC defender Matthew Jurman. The loss ends Sydney's 2-game losing streak, and moves them back into 3rd position behind Central Coast Mariners.
 7th: Sydney FC were supposed to be playing the Perth Glory at Campbelltown Stadium, Leumeah as part of the A-League's regional round. However, the match was postponed until further notice due to Perth Glory being unable to fly out from Perth Airport due to heavy storm activity in the area which prevented planes from arriving or departing to and from the airport. Due to the long distance between Sydney and Perth, the Glory are unable to fly the next morning.
 11th: Round 10 v Gold Coast United at Skilled Park Robina on the Gold Coast ends up with a disappointing 0–0 draw for the Sky Blues, against a Gold Coast United outfit sitting last on the A-League ladder. The game was slightly marred post game, when it was revealed that Sydney FC defender Shannon Cole would be fined by the club, after being found guilty of Diving, breaching the clubs no tolerance policy regarding simulation, which is frowned upon by the world governing body FIFA and fans world wide.
 17th: Round 11 v Newcastle Jets at Ausgrid Stadium, Newcastle results in a come-from-behind victory against Sydney's Northern New South Wales rivals. The Jets scored first after dominating the first half-hour of the game via a strike from New Zealand international Jeremy Brockie before Sydney FC clawed their way back into the game. Brazilian striker Bruno Cazarine leveled the scoreline, 19 minutes into the second half, after a smart cross from Karol Kisel in front of goal, followed by a simple header from Finnish striker Juho Makela on 84 minutes. The game also marked the debut of youth player Mitchell Mallia who came on as a substitute in the second half.
 22nd: Round 12 v Adelaide United at the Sydney Football Stadium, Moore Park saw Adelaide arrive in Sydney, having sacked their coach Rini Coolen only days previously. replacing him with Vitezslav Lavickas predecessor John Kosmina, who had also been Adelaide United manager from 2005 until 2007. The game finished 2–2, with Daniel Mullen opening the scoring for the Reds, following a brain explosion from Sydney FC captain Terry McFlynn who miskicked a back-pass which ended in a corner. Bruno Cazarine was brought down in the penalty area. Slovakian Karol Kisel fired the ball home. In the second half Dario Vidosic won a penalty for the Reds, which he converted himself, however Sydney youth star Dimitri Petratos gave Sydney a share of the points when he fired home a ball from the edge of the penalty area, and took a glance off the inside of the post, ending the game 2–2.
 29th: Round 13 v Melbourne Heart at the Sydney Football Stadium, Moore Park brought Sydney FC's largest crowd of the season thus far for the final game of the year. However, it was not to be a happy time for the Sky Blues, completely dominated from the opening whistle. Despite showing early promise through Brazilian Bruno Cazarine, the Heart opened the scoring through Eli Babalj in the 32nd minute. Heart doubled their advantage right on the stroke of half time, through Mate Dugandzic. The game was all but over for Sydney FC when Jason Hoffman made it 3–0. However Heart's Brazilian striker Alex Terra would have the laugh last in the dying minutes of the game when he made it 4–0 after Sydney FC goalkeeper dropped the ball right in front of him, in his eagerness to get the ball up the field after intercepting the cross, Terra calmly dribbled the ball to the goal line before booting it in the net, ending the rout and a painful 90 minutes for the harbour team. The loss would also see Wellington leapfrog them into 4th, with Sydney dropping into 5th.

January
 4th: Round 14 – Big Wednesday v Wellington Phoenix at Westpac Stadium, Wellington, New Zealand saw Sydney travel to the "Cake-Tin" for the second time the season, in the hope of burying the memories of their previous game with a win. However, it was not to be despite Sydney FC getting the scoring underway via a penalty from Brett Emerton. Goals from Daniel, Dani Sanchez, Ben Sigmund and Paul Ifill would see Sydney FC concede 4 goals for the second week in a row. Bruno Cazaerine added a 2nd goal for Sydney in the second half, but it would be nothing more than a mere consolation goal, for a team struggling to find at consistency at the back, or in front of goal.
 8th: Round 15 v Central Coast Mariners at Sydney Football Stadium, Moore Park saw a short turn around of just 4 days after the mid-week round, and had Sydney FC facing the table topping Mariners in what would be considered to be a crucial game for Sydney coach Vitezslav Lavicka who it was revealed had 4-weeks remaining to turn the season around, or face an inevitable axing once the season had finished. With the passing of one of Sydney's most loyal fans, "Doggadog" who was remembered with a minutes silence before the game, it was expected that Sydney would lift and play hard against their South NSW Derby rivals from the very start. However, this was not the case, with Sydney struggling to find any cohesion within themselves, and as has been the story for so many games this season, they went behind first through Central Coast's birthday boy Oliver Bozanic who was given too much room and buried the ball in the net. The Second half would show a much better performance from Sydney FC, having the best part of the possession and chances, however the Mariners defence held strong, and the score remained the same until the final whistle, leaving Sydney with 1 point from their last 5 games.
 14th: Round 16 v Brisbane Roar at Suncorp Stadium, Brisbane, Queensland sees Sydney FC travel north of the border the venue where they have failed to win since early 2007. A goal from Mark Bridge not only ended his goal scoring drought, but also allowed the Sydney FC team to believe they might get their first win in 4 years. However, the dream was to be shattered, late into Extra Time, when former Bahraini criminal Sayed Mohamed Adnan scored from a free kick. A now rejuvenated Brisbane, refused to lay down against a tiring Sydney FC defence, and Albanian Besart Berisha scored from a suspicious handball cross from Mitch Nichols to seal a 2–1 victory and all 3 points against a Sydney FC team who were shocked at not taking him the 3 points.
 '19th: Community Round v Perth Glory at Campbelltown Stadium, Leumeah saw Sydney play Perth a month later than originally planned. Due to the 5:30 pm kick-off many fans were unable to attend. Sydney FC took the lead once more just before the half time interval, and once more Sydney fans held their breath in the hope of taking away 3 points and hopefully kick starting their season which had seemingly stalled, having lost 5 on the trot. However, it scenes becoming all to familiar Sydney's defence fell asleep in the dying minutes of the half, and conceded what was arguably a soft goal from a corner, levelling the scores at 1–1, to the final whistle.
 23rd: Round 17 v Gold Coast United at Sydney Football Stadium, Moore Park. After 6 games without a win, Sydney FC finally got a much needed 3 points against a Gold Coast team who were coming last on the ladder. However, the match started with familiar scenes with Gold Coast opening the scoring through Ben Halloran in the 55th minute, it looked like Sydney FC would never be able to control a game for 90 minutes. However a late comeback saw Slovakian Import Karol Kisel peg a goal back in the 71st minute, before turning provider in the 81st for Brazilian Bruno Cazarine in the 89th minute. The win moved Sydney back into finals contention having dropped out of the 6.
 26th (Australia Day): Round 18: v Melbourne Victory at AAMI Park, Melbourne. The City Derby clash between Sydney and Melbourne always brings excitement and entertaining football between the two rival clubs, and this game, billed on Australia Day was no exception. Both Sydney and Melbourne were having poor seasons, and struggling to make it into finals contention, and 3 points to either side would have done a good deal to getting either team into the finals. Melbourne Victory looked the team to do it, with a double blow just before half time through Isaka Cernak and Fabio gave the hosts a convincing 2-0 lead at half time. However Melbourne's weakness this season is their ability to hold onto a lead, and once again they failed. Bruno Cazarine pegged a goal back for Sydney, scoring his 2nd in as many games, and his 6th for the season, and right at the death from a free kick, former Melbourne Victory player Sebastian Ryall scored his first ever professional goal, giving Sydney a hard earned and well fought for point away from home.

February
 3rd: Manager Vitezslav Lavicka announces at a press conference that he will not renew his contract for next season, as he will be leaving the club at the end of the 2011-12 season, citing personal reasons.
 5th: Round 20: v Newcastle Jets at Sydney Football Stadium, Moore Park has Sydney concede 5 goals for the first time in 4 years as they lost 5-2. First half goals from former Sydney FC players Nikolai Topor-Stanley, Ruben Zadkovich and Jeremy Brockie see Sydney FC slump to a 3-0 deficit at half time. The second half saw a small comeback fought, with Hirofumi Moriyasu and Michael Beauchamp scoring their first goals of the season to bring it back to 3-2, however two further late goals from Brockie and Ali Abbas Al-Hilfi gave Sydney a loss nobody expected.
 11th: Round 21: v Perth Glory at Sydney Football Stadium, Moore Park has Sydney win a tightly fought contest, their fourth home win of the season. After being locked in 0-0 at half time, stand in captain for suspended Terry McFlynn, Brett Emerton scored the opener firing home a cross from Karol Kisel. Emerton turned scorer into provider, when he set up a cross which saw Bruno Cazarine header the ball into the Danny Vukovic who could only push the ball into the roof of the net, thus scoring his 7th of the season. Perth got a late consolation goal through Billy Mehmet but Sydney held out to win 2-1.

March

Preseason

2011–12 Hyundai A-League

†The Round 9 fixture against the Brisbane Roar was moved from the Sydney Football Stadium to Jubilee Oval due to an Eminem concert being held at the Sydney Football Stadium on the same day 

†The Round 10, regional fixture against Perth Glory was postponed until further notice, due to the Perth squad unable to leave Perth Airport due to bad weather.

Statistics

Goal scorers

Disciplinary record
Correct as of Round 14

Home Crowds

†The Round 9 fixture against the Brisbane Roar was moved from the Sydney Football Stadium to Jubilee Oval due to an Eminem concert being held at the Sydney Football Stadium on the same day .

Results by round

End-of-season awards
On 26 April, 2012, Sydney FC hosted their annual Sky Blue Ball and presented six awards on the night.

References

External links
 Sydney FC website
 A-League website

Sydney FC seasons
2011–12 A-League season by team